The Westralian Worker was a newspaper established in Kalgoorlie, Western Australia in 1900 and published until its demise in 1951 in Perth, Western Australia.

History 
It was established as the Official organ of the Western Australian Labor Party — with the subtitle of "A journal devoted to the interest of trade unionism, co-operation and labour in politics".

In April 1912 it was moved to Perth and was published by the Westralian Worker Printing and Publishing Company.  The company also published union books and pamphlets as well as the Westralian Worker.  It was also known as the People's Printing and Publishing Company.

The newspaper attempted to balance views between conscriptionists and anti-conscriptionists in World War I, but eventually became a mouthpiece for the anti-conscriptionists.

The editorial policy included tackling perceived biases of other Western Australian newspapers.

The newspaper was based in Holman House.

Notable editors 
Thomas Bath (1901-1902)
Wallace Nelson (1902-1903)
Julian Stuart (1903)
John Curtin (1917-1928)
Fred Gates (1928-1937)

Publishing details 
 Vol. 1, no. 1 (7 Sept. 1900)-no. 2219 (Friday, 22 June 1951)

Notes

External links 
 
 

Publications established in 1900
Newspapers published in Perth, Western Australia
Defunct newspapers published in Western Australia
1900 establishments in Australia
Publications disestablished in 1951
1951 disestablishments in Australia
Newspapers on Trove
Newspapers published in Goldfields-Esperance